Monkeytown is a small hamlet in Pendleton County, West Virginia, United States, on the mountain slope above the hamlet of Riverton.  It is located on U.S. Route 33 on the western face of North Fork Mountain.

This town was never incorporated as a town, but has existed as an area relevant to local people. The area was inhabited by Native American tribes long before being settled by European immigrants.  Those who now live in the area are a mixture of German, Swiss, Irish, Scottish, and English descent.  The population is now less than fifty persons.

History
The town allegedly got its name from the local general store where its owner kept a pet monkey, and from that people began calling the place 'monkey town.'. In reality, Virgil Hinkle, the store owner, never owned a pet monkey. The name actually came from Don Burns saying the children hanging out of neighborhood windows reminded him of a monkey town.  The name stuck - still appearing on electric and phone bills as late as the 1980s.

At one point in the mid 20th century, the town boasted a bus stop, two country stores (one with gasoline pumps), and a post office located in the first (formerly monkeyed) general store.  Today all of these innovations have disappeared, with most of the civic works occurring in nearby Franklin which is the county seat.

References

 The Pendleton Times, Franklin, WV. March 1, 1935, May 10, 1935, February 14, 1941,  July 11, 1941, and April 5 & 12, 1946.

Unincorporated communities in West Virginia
Unincorporated communities in Pendleton County, West Virginia